Maine-Ocean Express is a 1986 French comedy film directed by Jacques Rozier.

Cast 
 Bernard Ménez - Le controleur Le Garrec
 Yves Afonso - Petitgas Marcel
 Luis Rego - Le controleur Lucien Pontoiseau
 Lydia Feld - Maître Mimi de Saint-Marc
 Rosa-Maria Gomes - Dejanira
 Pedro Armendáriz Jr. - Pedro De La Moccorra
 Bernard Dumaine - Le Président du Trubunal
 Jean-Paul Bonnaire - Le prosecureur
  - Lucien Vallée

References

External links 

1986 comedy films
1986 films
French comedy films
Films set in Nantes
1980s French-language films
1980s French films